Siegfried Samuel Marcus (18 September 1831 – 1 July 1898) was a German inventor. Marcus was born of Jewish descent in Malchin, in the Grand Duchy of Mecklenburg-Schwerin.  He made the first petrol-powered vehicle in 1864, while living in Vienna, Austria.

Life

Marcus was born in Malchin, in the Grand Duchy of Mecklenburg-Schwerin into a Jewish family. Today Malchin is part of Germany. He began work at age 12 as an apprentice mechanic. At 17 he joined Siemens and Halske, an engineering company that built telegraph lines. He moved to Vienna, the capital of the Austrian Empire, in 1852, working first as a technician in the Physical Institute of the Medical School. He then worked as an assistant to Professor Carl Ludwig, a physiologist. In 1860 Marcus opened his own workshop which made mechanical and electrical equipment. The first was located at Mariahilferstrasse 107 and the second at Mondscheingasse 4.

His chief improvements include telegraph relay system and ignition devices such as the "Wiener Zünder", a blasting machine. Marcus was buried at the Protestant Cemetery at Hütteldorf, Vienna. Later, his remains were transferred to an "Honorary Tomb" of Vienna's Central Cemetery. During his lifetime he was awarded the Golden Cross of Merit by the then Austro-Hungarian Emperor Franz Joseph for his scientific achievements.

Nazi rewrite

Because of Marcus' Jewish ancestry, his name and all memorabilia, particularly in Austria, vanished under the Nazis. In 1937 the Austrian Harand Movement Against Racial Hatred had issued a series of stamps featuring prominent Jews, including Marcus, who had contributed to mankind in response to the Ewiger Jude (eternal Jew) exhibition by Julius Streicher in Munich. Marcus was credited as having invented the petrol driven motor car. With the German occupation of Austria in March 1938, the memorial in front of the Vienna Technical University was removed. After World War II, the monument was rebuilt and his car, which had been hidden, was returned to display.

Marcus was removed from German encyclopedias as the inventor of the modern car, under a directive from the German Ministry for Propaganda during World War II. His name was replaced with the names of Daimler and Benz. The directive (in German) read as follows:

In English this would be

Current Austrian thinking is that Marcus' first car ran in the late 1880s. However, early publications suggest that he may have had a petrol powered vehicle running earlier than 1870. The deliberate destruction of evidence of Marcus' inventions by the Nazi regime has left these dates open to debate and speculation. Britannica cites 1864 for Marcus' first car with a 10-year gap to the second, which is consistent with other sources.

Marcus' cars

Based on the information from existing sources, Marcus' first machine was built on a simple handcart in 1870. but had to be started by lifting the drive wheels off the ground and spinning them. The internal combustion engine was designed for liquid combustibles and made him the first to propel a vehicle by means of petrol. Marcus was not satisfied with this cart and dismantled it. However, his first automobile model was displayed at the Vienna Exhibition in 1864 (more likely the 1873 Vienna Internation Exhibition according to earliest sources) and his second model was made and driven in 1875.

In 1883 a patent for a low-voltage ignition magneto was given to Marcus in Germany and a new petrol engine built.

This design was used for all further engines, including that of the only existing Marcus car from 1888 to 1889. It was this ignition, in conjunction with the "rotating brush carburettor", that made the engine's design very innovative. By 1886 the German navy was using the engine in its torpedo boats.

In 1887, Marcus started a co-operation with the Moravian company Märky, Bromovsky & Schulz. They offered two stroke and — after the fall of the Otto-Patent in 1886 — four stroke engines of the Marcus type.

In 1875 Märky, Bromovsky & Schulz built the car which can still be seen in Vienna's Technical Museum. This car made Marcus well-known all over the world. The car was named a Historic Mechanical Engineering Landmark by the American Society of Mechanical Engineers.

In a 1904 book, "The Motor," it states: Who was the Inventor? Siegfried Marcus is widely credited with having invented the benzine motor.

John Nixon of the London Times in 1938 considered Marcus' development of the motor car to have been experimental, as opposed to Benz who took the concept from experimental to production. Nixon described Marcus' cars as impractical. 12 years later, in 1950, the Times described the car at the Vienna Technical Museum as being built in 1875 and the first petrol-powered road vehicle. A description of its first journey of 7.5 miles from Vienna to Klosterneuberg was included in the article. Since the car was moved to the Museum in 1918, it had only been driven twice. once when sent for display in Sweden.

Patents
Marcus was the holder of 131 patents in 16 countries. He never applied for a patent for the motorcar and, of course, he never held one. Nevertheless, he was the first to use petrol to propel a vehicle, in the simple handcart of 1864, but it is uncertain whether the extant Marcus car ran before 1890.

Some examples of his patents:
 33258, 10 September 1861, Improvements to relay magnets
 2058, 6 July 1872, Device for mixing of fuel with air
 286030, 2 October 1883, Improved gas engine
 306339, 7 October 1884, Electrical igniting device for gas engines

In conjunction with Captain E von Wohlgemuth of the Imperial German Navy, Marcus invented an electrical ignition of ships cannons. The advantages of the system were that it allowed for the simultaneous firing of the cannons, or selection of a particular firing pattern, and the ability to fire them from the ship's bridge.

Sources 
 
  Awarded as the June 2001 book of the month by the Austrian Academy of Science.

See also 
 History of the internal combustion engine
 List of Austrian scientists

References

External links 
 

 
 
 
 

1831 births
1898 deaths
Jewish scientists
People from Malchin
German automotive pioneers
German scientific instrument makers
People from the Grand Duchy of Mecklenburg-Schwerin
Burials at the Vienna Central Cemetery
Engineers from Mecklenburg-Western Pomerania